Mindouli (can also be written as Minduli) is a district in the Pool Region of south-eastern Republic of the Congo. The capital lies at Mindouli.

Towns and villages

Pool Department
Districts of the Republic of the Congo